Ernest Childers (February 1, 1918 – March 17, 2005) was a United States Army officer and a recipient of the United States military's highest decoration, the Medal of Honor, for his valorous actions in World War II.

Biography
Childers was born in Broken Arrow, Oklahoma, on February 1, 1918. A Muscogee (Creek) Indian, he graduated from the Chilocco Indian Agricultural School in north-central Oklahoma. Coincidentally, Jack C. Montgomery, who also earned the Medal of Honor in World War II for service in Italy, graduated from the same school.

In 1937, Childers joined the Oklahoma Army National Guard and was assigned to the 180th Infantry Regiment, 45th Infantry Division. After the U.S. entry into World War II, he was sent to Europe and by September 22, 1943, he was a second lieutenant serving with 45th Infantry Division, 180th Infantry Regiment, in Italy. On that day, at Oliveto, he single-handedly killed two enemy snipers, attacked two machine gun nests, and captured an artillery observer. For these actions, he was awarded the Medal of Honor seven months later, on April 8, 1944. He was the first Native American to earn the medal since the Indian Wars of the 19th century.

Childers reached the rank of lieutenant colonel before retiring from the Army. He died at age 87 and was buried at Floral Haven Memorial Gardens in his birthplace of Broken Arrow, Oklahoma.

Before his death, a middle school was named in his honor, Ernest Childers Middle School which is a part of Broken Arrow Public Schools and services grades 6th through 8th grade.
The Veteran's Administration Medical Center Community Based Outpatient Clinic in Tulsa, Oklahoma is named in his honor, the Ernest Childers Out Patient Clinic

Medal of Honor citation
Childers' official Medal of Honor citation reads:
For conspicuous gallantry and intrepidity at risk of life above and beyond the call of duty in action on 22 September 1943, at Oliveto, Italy. Although 2d Lt. Childers previously had just suffered a fractured instep he, with 8 enlisted men, advanced up a hill toward enemy machinegun nests. The group advanced to a rock wall overlooking a cornfield and 2d Lt. Childers ordered a base of fire laid across the field so that he could advance. When he was fired upon by 2 enemy snipers from a nearby house he killed both of them. He moved behind the machinegun nests and killed all occupants of the nearer one. He continued toward the second one and threw rocks into it. When the 2 occupants of the nest raised up, he shot 1. The other was killed by 1 of the 8 enlisted men. 2d Lt. Childers continued his advance toward a house farther up the hill and, single-handed, captured an enemy mortar observer. The exceptional leadership, initiative, calmness under fire and conspicuous gallantry displayed by 2d Lt. Childers were an inspiration to his men.

See also

List of Native American Medal of Honor recipients
List of Medal of Honor recipients for World War II

References

External links

1918 births
2005 deaths
Muscogee people
People from Broken Arrow, Oklahoma
United States Army colonels
United States Army personnel of World War II
United States Army Medal of Honor recipients
World War II recipients of the Medal of Honor
20th-century Native Americans
21st-century Native Americans